Malmöhus County was a county of Sweden from 1719 to 1996. On 1 January 1997 it was merged with Kristianstad County to form Skåne County. It had been named after Malmöhus, a castle in Malmö, which was also where the governor originally lived.

History
Malmöhus County was part of Skåne province which was controlled by Denmark until 1658. In 1657, Denmark  declared war on Sweden, while Sweden was at war with Russia, Poland, and Austria. Swedish forces were sent immediately from Poland to Denmark. Denmark was defeated which required the transfer of Skåne, Halland, Blekinge and Bohuslän provinces to Sweden under the Treaty of Roskilde. Denmark attempted to regain the lost provinces until 1710, but was unsuccessful.

Geography
Malmöhus County was part of Scania province situated on a peninsula that projects into the Baltic Sea on the northeast of the Öresund straits. The geography differs in many aspects from the rest of Sweden. The coastal regions typically have flat sandy beaches, while inland areas  have ridges of wooded hills and fields of rich fertile soil, which were left behind from the glacial age. Skåne province is called the granary of Sweden due to its rich fertile soil.

References

See also
 List of governors of Malmöhus County
 List of governors of Kristianstad County
 List of governors of Skåne County

Former counties of Sweden
History of Skåne County
Former counties of Scania
1719 establishments in Sweden
1996 disestablishments in Sweden